Irwin Lawrence "Paul" Mazursky (April 25, 1930 – June 30, 2014) was an American film director, screenwriter, and actor. Known for his dramatic comedies that often dealt with modern social issues, he was nominated for five Academy Awards: three times for Best Original Screenplay, once for Best Adapted Screenplay, and once for Best Picture for An Unmarried Woman (1978). His other films include Bob & Carol & Ted & Alice (1969), Blume in Love (1973), Harry and Tonto (1974), Moscow on the Hudson (1984), and Down and Out in Beverly Hills (1986).

Early life and education
He was born into a Jewish family in Brooklyn, New York, the son of Jean (née Gerson), a piano player for dance classes, and David Mazursky, a laborer. Mazursky's grandfather was an immigrant from Ukraine. Mazursky graduated from Brooklyn College in 1951.

Career

Acting
Mazursky began his film career as an actor in Stanley Kubrick's first feature, Fear and Desire (1953). Mazurksy, who never liked his first name of Irwin, was asked by his then-girlfriend Betty Purdy what name he wanted to use in the credits for the film, as he had told Kubrick to use her as a go-between when he was busy waiting tables at Sunrise Manor. When on the phone with her, she suggested using Paul for his screen name, which he agreed with.

Two years later he appeared in a featured position as one of a classroom of teenagers with issues towards authority in The Blackboard Jungle (1955). His acting career continued for several decades, starting with parts in episodes of television series such as The Twilight Zone and The Rifleman. He also did shows for nightclubs in the late 1950s, most notably with Herb Hartig, with their comedy act being named "Igor and H" before breaking up to do a solo act. He applied (and was rejected) to the Actors Studio, but he took classes with Lee Strasberg as instructor, having previously studied under Paul Mann and Curt Conway.

Mazursky appeared in supporting roles or cameos in most of his own films. In Moon over Parador (1988), with the Rio Opera House available for only three days of shooting, Mazursky cast himself as a dictator's mother when Judith Malina was unavailable, playing the character in drag.

Mazursky also played supporting roles in The Other Side of the Wind (1972; finished 2015), A Star Is Born (1976), History of the World Part I (1981), Into the Night (1985), Punchline (1988), Scenes from the Class Struggle in Beverly Hills (1989), Man Trouble (1992), Carlito's Way (1993), Love Affair (1994), 2 Days in the Valley (1996), Miami Rhapsody (1995), Crazy in Alabama (1999), and I Want Someone to Eat Cheese With (2006). He also performed the voice of the Psychologist in Antz (1998).

In later years, Mazursky had a small part as "Sunshine" the poker dealer in The Sopranos. He also appeared in five episodes of season 4 of Curb Your Enthusiasm as Mel Brooks' associate Norm, a role that he later reprised in a season 7 episode.

Writing and directing
Soon after starting his acting career, Mazursky became a writer and worked on The Danny Kaye Show in 1963 with Larry Tucker, who he had first known when Tucker went from personal manager of comedy clients to being a part of the Los Angeles operation of The Second City troupe. In 1965, they crafted the script of the original pilot of The Monkees television series, in which they both also appeared in cameos, although the pilot ended up being their only script for the series.

Mazursky's debut as a film screenwriter was the Peter Sellers comedy I Love You, Alice B. Toklas (1968). The original intent was for Tucker to produce and for Mazursky to direct. Peter Sellers, the star of the feature, instead picked Hy Averback to direct the film.

The following year, he directed his first film Bob & Carol & Ted & Alice (produced and written by Mazursky and Larry Tucker), which proved to be a major critical and commercial success. The film was the fifth highest grossing of the year and earned Mazursky his first Oscar nomination.

His career behind the camera continued for the next two decades as he wrote and directed a prolific string of quirky, dramatic and critically popular films. His most successful films were contemporary dramatic comedies and include the Academy Award-winning Harry and Tonto (1974), the Best Picture-nominated An Unmarried Woman (1978), and popular hits such as Moscow on the Hudson (1984) and Down and Out in Beverly Hills (1986). In light of his comedies that tackled a number of modern social subjects, The Hollywood Reporter stated that "from the late '60s through the '80s, [he] seemed to channel the zeitgeist..." and Variety stated that "his oeuvre smacks of cultural significance."

Other films made by Mazursky during this time include the Hollywood satire Alex in Wonderland (1970), the cutting Los Angeles relationship comedy Blume in Love (1973), the semi-autobiographical coming-of-age story Next Stop, Greenwich Village (1976), the New York City-based Jules and Jim homage Willie & Phil (1980), the contemporary Shakespeare comedy Tempest (1982), the Caribbean-set political farce Moon over Parador (1988), and the acclaimed Isaac Bashevis Singer adaptation Enemies, a Love Story (1989).

Film critic Roger Ebert was a particular fan of Mazursky's work, giving six of his films the optimal four stars in his reviews. In 1986, Ebert stated that "Mazursky has a way of making comedies that are more intelligent and relevant than most of the serious films around."

Mazursky experienced less success in the 1990s, beginning with Scenes from a Mall (1991), starring Woody Allen and Bette Midler. Following his filmmaking satire The Pickle (1993), which was his last writing credit, Mazursky worked only sporadically as a director on such films as Faithful (1996), Winchell (1998), and Coast to Coast (2003). His final film was the independent documentary Yippee (2006).

Every film written and directed by Mazursky used New York City or Los Angeles as one of its settings. In 1991 the Los Angeles Times commented that "No filmmaker has been wiser or funnier about the L.A. cavalcade than Mazursky. It's not simply a matter of being hip to the scene; what makes such L.A. movies as Bob & Carol & Ted & Alice and Alex in Wonderland and Blume in Love and Down and Out in Beverly Hills soar is Mazursky's wide-eyed infatuation with the city's rampant pop nuttiness."

His films received a total of twelve Academy Award nominations, with one win, and nineteen Golden Globe nominations, with two wins.

Other work
In his autobiography Show Me the Magic (1999), Mazursky recounts his experiences in filmmaking and with several well-known screen personalities including Peter Sellers. He was the subject of the 2011 book Paul on Mazursky by Sam Wasson.

Mazursky appeared as himself in a number of documentaries on film, including A Decade Under the Influence, New York at the Movies, and Screenwriters: Words Into Image.

Late in his life, Mazursky was developing a Broadway musical adaptation of his 1988 film Moon over Parador.

From 2011 until his death in 2014, Mazursky served as a film critic for Vanity Fair.

Accolades
Mazursky received five Academy Award nominations, four for his screenplay writing on Bob & Carol & Ted & Alice (1969), Harry and Tonto (1974), An Unmarried Woman (1978), and Enemies, a Love Story (1989), and once as producer of An Unmarried Woman (nominated for Best Picture). He was also twice nominated for a Golden Globe and twice for the Cannes Film Festival's Palm d'Or, among many other awards.

In 2000, he was the recipient of the Austin Film Festival's Distinguished Screenwriter Award.

In 2000, he was awarded the Amicus Poloniae (Latin: "Friend of Poland"), which is a distinction established by the Polish ambassador to the United States and conferred annually on citizens of the United States for special contributions to Polish-American relations.

In 2010, the Los Angeles Film Critics Association honored him with an award for Career Achievement.

On December 13, 2013, Mazursky was awarded the 2,515th star of the Hollywood Walk of Fame, in front of Musso & Frank Grill. Friends and collaborators Mel Brooks, Richard Dreyfuss, and Jeff Garlin were all present.

On February 1, 2014, at the WGA Awards, Mazursky received the Screen Laurel Award, which is the lifetime achievement award of the Writers Guild of America. Comedian, filmmaker and close friend Mel Brooks presented the award.

In May 2014, Mazursky received the Best of Brooklyn Award at his alma mater Brooklyn College's annual gala in New York City.

In 2015, Joe Swanberg's film Digging for Fire was dedicated in memory to Mazursky.

In 2019, Greg Pritikin dedicated his film The Last Laugh to Mazursky.

Personal life 
Mazursky was married to librarian and social worker Betsy Mazursky (née Purdy) from 1953 until his death. They had two daughters, Meg and Jill. Mazursky was an atheist.

Mazursky went into cardiopulmonary arrest and died on June 30, 2014, aged 84, at Cedars-Sinai Medical Center in Los Angeles.

Filmography

As writer and director

As writer only

As director only

Selected acting credits

References

External links
Ken Regan's Celebrity Portraiture: Paul Mazursky Comes Home | "From the Stacks" at New-York Historical Society

 The films of Paul Mazursky, Hell Is For Hyphenates, August 31, 2014

1930 births
2014 deaths
20th-century American male actors
21st-century American male actors
American male film actors
American male television actors
American male stage actors
American people of Ukrainian-Jewish descent
Brooklyn College alumni
CAS Filmmaker Award honorees
Film directors from New York City
Jewish American atheists
Jewish American male actors
People from Brooklyn